Suzanne Urverg-Ratsimamanga (18 June 1928 - 16 March 2016) was a French-Malagasy Ashkenazi Jewish physician and biochemist.

Early life and education 
Suzanne was born in Paris, France, on 18 June 1928. She received her Bachelor of Science in 1953, Doctor of Medicine in 1954, and Diploma and Master of Science in Industrial Hygiene and Medicine in 1955, all from the University of Paris.

Research and career 
Suzanne was married to Albert Rakoto Ratsimamanga since 23 March 1963, and was his closest scientific collaborator. She was IMRA’s Chair and Professor of Medicine. IMRA focused on Phytotherapy to use local plants and traditional practices to cure diseases, i.e., traditional pharmacopoeia. IMRA succeeded in using the Syzygium cumini tree as an anti-diabetic agent,  and creating alternative medicines against malaria, leprosy, asthma, lithiasis, blood pressure, hepatitis and other common conditions. This has established IMRA as a research centre; however, IMRA’s reputation was all but ruined due to the Covid-Organics controversy.

Awards and honours 
She was made a Knight of the Legion of Honour on the 12 of July 1996, a Fellow of The World Academy of Sciences (1989), and the African Academy of Sciences (1987). She was the African Academy of Sciences' President of the Scientific Committee in 1992. She was awarded the National Order of  Malagasy.

Death 
Suzanne died on 16 March 2016 and was buried at Cimetière Parisien de Bagneux.

See also 
 Rajaona Andriamananjara

References

External links 
 Suzanne Urverg-Ratsimamanga at Google Scholar.

Fellows of the African Academy of Sciences
TWAS fellows
Ashkenazi Jews
French biochemists
Malagasy physicians